Jack Brennan is an English former professional rugby league footballer who played as a . Born in Wigan, Brennan began his career at Blackpool Borough, and went on to play for Salford and Warrington. He also represented Lancashire.

Career

Club career
Brennan started his rugby league career with Blackpool Borough, joining the club at the age of seventeen. In August 1959, he joined Salford for a fee of £5,000.

In 1969, he played in the Challenge Cup Final at Wembley Stadium against Castleford, which Salford lost 6–11. He joined Warrington during the 1970–71 season, but retired after only three appearances for the club.

Representative career
Brennan made two appearances for Lancashire in 1958 whilst at Blackpool Borough, losing both games to Yorkshire.

References

Living people
Blackpool Borough players
English rugby league players
Lancashire rugby league team players
Rugby league halfbacks
Rugby league players from Wigan
Salford Red Devils players
Warrington Wolves players
Year of birth missing (living people)